The list of ship launches in 1963 includes a chronological list of all ships launched in 1963.



References

Sources

1963
Ship launches